Souleyman Keli Doumbia (born 24 September 1996) is an Ivorian professional footballer who plays as a left-back for Ligue 1 club Angers and the Ivory Coast national team.

Club career

Early career 
Doumbia was part of the Paris Saint-Germain youth academy from 2009 to 2016. In the summer of 2016, he was transferred to Serie B club Bari, where he made his professional debut on 22 October versus Trapani. On 31 January 2017, Doumbia joined fellow Serie B side Vicenza on loan.

Rennes 
In January 2019 he signed a three-year contract with Stade Rennais.

Angers 
In January 2020, Doumbia joined Angers SCO on loan until the end of the 2019–20 season. In July 2020, Angers exercised their option to sign him permanently for a reported transfer fee of about €3 million. Doumbia signed a three-year contract.

International career
Doumbia was born in France to parents of Ivorian descent. He was first called up to represent the Ivory Coast U20s for the 2015 Toulon Tournament. He also started for the Ivory Coast U23s in a 5–1 friendly loss to the France U21s. He made his Ivory Coast national football team debut on 15 June 2019 in a friendly against Uganda, as a starter.

Career statistics

Club
.

References

External links
 
 
 

Living people
1996 births
Footballers from Paris
French footballers
Citizens of Ivory Coast through descent
Ivorian footballers
Ivory Coast under-20 international footballers
Ivory Coast international footballers
Association football defenders
S.S.C. Bari players
L.R. Vicenza players
Grasshopper Club Zürich players
Stade Rennais F.C. players
Angers SCO players
Ligue 1 players
Championnat National 2 players
Serie B players
Swiss Super League players
2019 Africa Cup of Nations players
French expatriate footballers
Ivorian expatriate footballers
Expatriate footballers in Italy
French expatriate sportspeople in Italy
Ivorian expatriate sportspeople in Italy
French sportspeople of Ivorian descent